Conway is a Welsh, Irish & Scottish surname. It can be an anglicized spelling of Conwy, of the Irish names Conbhuidhe or Ó Connmhacháin, or of the Scottish names Mac Conmheadha or Mac Connmhaigh.

Notable people with the surname include:

 Alan Conway, impersonator of Stanley Kubrick
 Albert Conway (1889–1969), Chief Judge of the New York Court of Appeals (1955–1959)
 Andrew Conway (born 1991), Irish rugby union player
 Anne Conway, Viscountess Conway (1631–1679), English philosopher
 Anne C. Conway (born 1950), American lawyer and Senior United States District Judge
 Arthur Conway (disambiguation)
 Connie Conway (born 1950), American politician
 Cornelius Conway Felton (1807–1862), American educator and regent of the Smithsonian Institution
 Curtis Conway, former NFL wide receiver
 Damian Conway, Perl guru
 Dan Conway (born 1985), English cricketer
 David Conway (disambiguation)
 Deborah Conway, Australian singer and songwriter
 Delores Conway, American statistician and economist
 Derek Conway, British politician
 Devon Conway (born 1991), New Zealand cricketer
 Edward Conway, 2nd Viscount Conway, PC (1594–1655), English politician, military commander, bibliophile and peer
 Edward Joseph Conway, Irish biochemist
 Elias Nelson Conway (1812–1892), American politician and 5th Governor of Arkansas from 1852 to 1860
 Marshall "Eddie" Conway (1946-2023), Black Panther Party member from Baltimore
 Edwin Michael Conway (1934–2004), American Catholic bishop
 Elias Nelson Conway, American politician
 Francis Seymour-Conway, 1st Marquess of Hertford (1718-1794), British courtier and politician
 Gary Conway (born 1936), American actor
 George Conway (disambiguation)
 George T. Conway III, American attorney
 Gerry Conway, American comic book writer
 Gerry Conway (musician), English drummer
 Gordon Conway, English ecologist
 Harry Conway (born 1992), Australian cricketer
 Hélène Conway-Mouret (born 1960), French politician
 Helen Conway-Ottenheimer, Canadian politician
 Henry Seymour Conway, British general and statesman
 Henry Wharton Conway, American politician
 Hugh Conway (1847–1885), English novelist
 Hugh Conway (Lord Treasurer) (fl. 1494), Irish politician
 Hugh E. Conway (born 1942), American labor economics academic
 Jack Conway (disambiguation)
 James Conway (disambiguation)
 Jill Ker Conway, Australian-American author
 Jim Conway (baseball) (1858–1912), American baseball player
 Jimmy Conway, Irish-American gangster
 John Conway (cricketer) (1842-1909), Australian cricketer 
 John B. Conway, mathematics professor at University of Tennessee
 John Horton Conway (1937–2020), English mathematician
 Jon Conway, American soccer player
 Kate Conway, Canadian actress
 Katherine Eleanor Conway (1853–1927; pen name, "Mercedes"), American journalist, editor, poet
 Kathie Conway, member of the Missouri House of Representatives
 Kellyanne Conway (born 1967), American Republican campaign manager, strategist, and pollster
 Kevin Conway (disambiguation)
 Kieron Conway (born 1996), English boxer
 Lisa Conway, Canadian musician and producer
 Lynn Conway, American computer scientist and inventor
 Markies Conway, American rapper known professionally as Yella Beezy
 Martin Conway (disambiguation)
 Martin Conway, 1st Baron Conway of Allington (1856-1937), English nobleman
 Melvin Conway, inventor of coroutines
 Mic Conway (born 1951), Australian vocalist 
 Michael Conway (Irish senator), Irish politician
 Mike Conway, British racing driver
 Moncure Daniel Conway, American clergyman and author
 Pete Conway (1866–1903), American baseball player
 Robert Conway (admiral), officer in the United States Navy
 Rob Conway, American professional wrestler
 Robert Seymour Conway, British classical scholar and philologist
 Russ Conway (1925–2000), stage name of Trevor Stanford, English popular music pianist
 Russ Conway (journalist), American investigative journalist
 Sally Conway (born 1987), Scottish judoka 
 Samuel Conway  American researcher and owner of Anthrocon
 Sean Conway, Canadian professor
 Shirl Conway, stage and television actress
 Simon Conway Morris FRS (born 1951), English palaeontologist, evolutionary biologist, and astrobiologist
 Sophie Conway (born 1999), Australian rules footballer
 Steve Conway (politician) (born 1944), American politician
 Steve Conway (singer) (1920–1952), British singer
 Thomas Conway, soldier in America's Revolutionary War
 Thomas F. Conway (1862-1945), American lawyer and politician
 Tiger Conway Sr. (1932-2006), American professional wrestler 
 Tim Conway (1933–2019), American comedic actor
 Tim Conway Jr., American radio talk show host
 Timothy Conway (born 1942), Irish politician 
 Tom Conway, British actor
 William Conway (disambiguation)
 Zoë Conway, Irish violinist
Fictional characters:
 Hugh Conway, protagonist of James Hilton's novel Lost Horizon
 Conway family, characters in Accidents Happen
 Jimmy Conway, gangster associate in crime film Goodfellas, based on Jimmy Burke
 Will Conway, Republican nominee for U.S. president on season 4 of House of Cards, played by Joel Kinnaman

Conway is a component of the compound surname Conway Morris:
 Simon Conway Morris, British palaeontologist

English-language surnames